The telnyashka is an undershirt horizontally striped in white and blue (occasionally black or green) and which may be sleeveless. It is an iconic uniform garment worn by various Russian military formations.

Technical details

The official uniforms of Naval, Airborne and Naval Infantry personnel do not include conventional shirts. Open fronted jackets of various designs make the distinctively striped telnyashka a conspicuous part of the clothing of these different branches of the Russian armed forces.

Telnyashkas are also available to civilian customers and may come in a variety of knittings. Single-stranded knitting is the standard military-issue variant, but double- and quadruple-stranded knitting for increased warmth can be produced.

History

The Russian telnyashka originated in the distinctive striped marinière blouse worn by merchant sailors and fishermen of Brittany, who adopted this style to distinguish them from other sea-going nationalities. The fashion was later adopted and popularized by the French Navy and other navies of the pre-dreadnought era. Sailors of the modern French Navy still wear these garments in certain orders of dress.

The Imperial Russian Navy adopted the blue and white striped telnyashka blouse during the 19th century. The tradition of Russian or Soviet ground troops wearing a naval uniform comes from Soviet Navy sailors who fought as shore units during World War II. It is exemplified by the famed Soviet sniper Vassili Zaitsev, a petty officer in the Soviet Pacific Fleet who volunteered for army duty, but refused to give up his telnyashka because of the pride it engendered.

Vasily Margelov, who was later to modernize the Soviet Airborne Forces (VDV), had previously served with a Naval Infantry unit in World War II, and procured telnyashkas for the VDV as a mark of their elite status.

Use in the Russian military 
Although the telnyashka is first and foremost associated with the blue color, other colors have subsequently been added in service:  The color of the telnyashka matches that of the beret, with the only exception being the marines (matching it with a black beret).

Blue color 

 Russian Navy - the telnyashka originated in the Russian Navy and the first military branch to use them were the sailors. Dating back to the 19th century Imperial Navy, it was subsequently worn by the Soviet successors of these troops.
 Russian marines, PDSS and submarine crewmen - as branches of the Navy they wear the blue-color telnyashka as part of their official uniform, but in the field they use the black-white variation.
 maritime service of the Border Troops - it follows the traditions of the Russian and Soviet Navy, including its system of ranks and the telnyashka 
 Russian Airborne Troops (VDV) - at General Vasily Margelov's own idea as a means to underline the VDV's elite status and as a 'sister branch' to the marines. This almost brought him and Chief of the Navy Admiral Sergey Gorshkov to fighting blows at a meeting in the office of the Minister of Defence.
 GRU Spetsnaz - the special units of the military intelligence originate from VDV personnel and receives its training at the Ryazan Guards Higher Airborne Command School. Additionally for covert purposes when deployed in the field GRU spetsnaz units often wear VDV uniforms and the telnyashka is officially part of the uniform.
 KGB Border Troops airborne units - they received their air assault training from the VDV and shared their branch insignia and uniform (including the telnyashka)
 Federal Security Service spetsnaz units and the Kremlin Regiment of the Federal Protective Service wear cornflower blue telnyashkas as part of their uniform.
 KGB and FSB officers fulfilling military counter-intelligence role wear the same color as that of the unit they are assigned to.

Green color 

 Border Service of the Federal Security Service of the Russian Federation follow the traditions of their Soviet predecessor and wear the green telnyashka (except for the naval and airborne border troops). The green color is also used by the Border Troops of Belarus.

Red color 

 National Guard of Russia inherited the red beret and the red-white telnyashka (more specifically maroon - краповый) from its Interior Troops predecessor.

Orange color 
The Russian Ministry of Emergency Situations is a quasi-military organisation. While mostly in charge of civil defence and firefighters, the ministry uses army-style ranks and during his tenure as Minister Sergei Shoigu has introduced the orange-color telnyashka.

In other countries

The Bulgarian 68-th Special Forces Brigade uses the telnyashka as part of its uniform. Sailors of the Cuban Revolutionary Navy wear telnyashkas with blue stripes as part of their uniform.

The Korean People's Army Navy also uses them with their uniforms.

In popular culture
Soviet 1936 film The Sailors of Kronstadt started aestheticization of telnyashka with a scene of a Bolshevik sailor emerging from the sea in his torn undershirt after surviving an attempted execution by drowning.

The telnyashka is worn by a number of popular non-military characters of cinema and children's cartoons, notably The Wolf in Nu, pogodi and Matroskin the Cat in Troe iz Prostokvashino.

The telnyashka is worn by members of various factions in the 2019 video game Metro Exodus.

In the 2010 video game, Call of Duty: Black Ops, Lev Kravchenko, the secondary antagonist can be seen wearing a telnyashka under his jacket, other characters such as Viktor Reznov can be seen wearing this outfit on his assault on Rebirth Island with Alex Mason. Mason himself is depicted as wearing this outfit when it is revealed that Viktor Reznov is actually dead, and that any depiction of Reznov prior was actually of Mason.

In the 2019 video game, Call of Duty: Modern Warfare, a Russian soldier, J-12, is portrayed wearing a sleeveless telnyashka under a tactical ammo vest during Farah Karim's flashback of the Russian invasion of Urzikstan. Other Russian characters such as General Roman Barkov, Sergeant Kamarov as well as Multiplayer operative Maxim "Minotaur" Bale can also be seen wearing blue telnyashkas with the former two wearing it beneath their uniforms. Other Campaign character, Chimera operative "Nikolai", wears a dark telnyashka shirt as part of his Multiplayer skins.

There is a popular saying: "We are few in number, but we wear telnyashkas!", referring to the supposed effect of the striped shirt in creating the illusion of greater numbers.

See also
Sailor suit

References

External links
 Zaitsev, Vassili. "Notes of a Russian Sniper." Trans. David Givens, Peter Kornakov, Konstantin Kornakov. Ed. Neil Orkent. Los Angeles: 2826 Press Inc., 2003.
 Presidential Decree N 921 of 28.08.2006 (http://lawrussia.ru/texts/legal_739/doc739a408x944.htm)

20th-century fashion
Russian clothing
Military uniforms
Russian Navy
Soviet Navy
Soviet Army
Soviet culture